Kenneth James Eustice is a former Australian rules footballer who played with West Adelaide, Central District and Glenelg in the South Australian National Football League (SANFL).

Eustice started his career in 1958 with West Adelaide and was a member of their premiership side in 1961. He usually played on the wing at West Adelaide and it was in that position that he won the 1962 Magarey Medal. During his time as captain-coach at Central District he played as a centreman and won their best and fairest award in 1967. He also a best and fairest winner at Glenelg, taking out the award in 1969 as he neared the end of his 224-game SANFL career. A regular for South Australia at interstate football, Eustice was used mostly as a half back flanker.

External links
SA Football Hall of Fame – Ken J Eustice
WAFC Magarey Medallists – Kenneth James Eustice

Central District Football Club coaches
Central District Football Club players
West Adelaide Football Club players
Glenelg Football Club players
Magarey Medal winners
Australian rules footballers from South Australia
South Australian Football Hall of Fame inductees
Living people
Year of birth missing (living people)